Goat meat or goat's meat is the meat of the domestic goat (Capra aegagrus hircus). The common name for goat meat is simply "goat", while that from young goats can be called capretto (It.), cabrito (Sp. and Por.) or kid. In South Asian and Caribbean cuisine, mutton commonly means goat meat. In South Asia, where mutton curry is popular, "mutton" is used for both goat and lamb meat.

The culinary name "chevon", a blend of  'goat' and  'sheep', was coined in 1922 and selected by a trade association; it was adopted by the United States Department of Agriculture in 1928., however the term never caught on and is not  encountered in the United States.  "Cabrito", a word of Spanish and Portuguese origin, refers specifically to the meat of a young, milk-fed goat. It is also known as chivo.

In cuisine 

Goat is both a staple and a delicacy in world's cuisines. The cuisines best known for their use of goat include African cuisine, Middle Eastern, North African, East African, West African, Indian, Indonesian, Nepali, Bangladeshi, Pakistani, Mexican, Caribbean (Jamaica), and Ecuadorian. Cabrito, or baby goat, is a very typical food of Monterrey, Nuevo León, Mexico; in Italy it is called "capretto". Goat meat can be prepared in a variety of ways, such as being stewed, curried, baked, grilled, barbecued, minced, canned, fried, or made into sausage. Goat jerky is also another popular variety.

Africa
In Africa, among the Chaga people of Tanzania, a ceremonial goat (locally called ndafu) is gutted and roasted whole as part of a centuries-old tradition. The ceremonial goat is the preferred replacement to the wedding cake used in many weddings around the world.

Europe
Southern Italian, Greek, Serbian, and Portuguese cuisines are also known for serving roast goat in celebration of Easter (in Italian cuisines, goat is used in spaghetti bolognese and lasagna as an alternative for beef), with the North of Portugal serving it as well on Christmas day; goat dishes are also an Easter staple in the alpine regions of central Europe, often braised (Bavaria) or breaded and fried (Tyrol).

North America
Goat has historically been less commonplace in American, Canadian and Northern European cuisines but has become more popular in some niche markets, including those that serve immigrants from Asia and Africa who prefer goat to other meat.  the number of goats slaughtered in the United States has doubled every 10 years for three decades, rising to nearly one million annually. While in the past goat meat in the West was confined to ethnic markets, it can now be found in a few upscale restaurants and purveyors, especially in cities such as New York City and San Francisco. Costco stores in the Philadelphia suburbs keep whole frozen goats in a Halal case. Brady, Texas has held its Annual World Championship BBQ Goat Cook-Off annually since 1973.

Latin America
Cabrito, a specialty especially common in Latin American cuisine such as Mexican, Peruvian, Brazilian, and Argentine, is usually slow roasted. In Mexican cuisine, there are a variety of dishes including Birria (a spicy goat stew) and cabrito entomatado which means it is boiled in a tomato and spices sauce.

Asia
In Okinawa (Japan), goat meat is served raw in thin slices as yagisashi.

On the Indian subcontinent, the rice dish mutton biryani and the mutton curries prepared in parts of Uttar Pradesh, Hyderabad and Bihar, use goat meat as a primary ingredient to produce a rich taste. Curry goat is a common traditional Indo-Caribbean dish. In Bangladesh, West Bengal, traditional meat dishes like kosha mangsho and rezala are prepared using meat from a khashi, a castrated goat with meat that has richer taste and a milder, less gamey flavour.

Goat meat is also a major delicacy in Nepal, and both castrated (khashi-ko-masu) and uncastrated (boka-ko-masu) goats are sacrificed during Dashain, the largest annual celebrations in the country, as well as on other festive occasions. There are many separate dishes, which together include all edible parts of the animal. Bhutun is made from the gut, rakhti from the blood, karji-marji from the liver and lungs, and the feet – khutti – are often made into soup. Sukuti is a kind of jerky, while sekuwa is made from roasted meat and often eaten with alcoholic beverages. In addition to these dishes, goat meat is often eaten as part of momos, thukpa, chow mein and other dishes in various parts of the country. Taas is another popular fried goat meat dish in Nepal, particularly popular in districts of the central region.

In Indonesia, goat meat is popularly skewered and grilled as sate kambing, or curried in soups such as sup kambing and Gulai kambing.

Characteristics 

Goat has a reputation for having a strong, gamey flavor, but the taste can also be mild, depending on how it is raised and prepared. Caribbean cultures often prefer meat from mature goats, which tends to be more pungent, while some other cultures prefer meat that comes from younger goats that are six to nine months old. Ribs, loins, and tenderloin goat meat are suitable for quick cooking, while other cuts are best for long braising. Despite being classified as red meat, goat is leaner and contains less cholesterol and fat than both lamb and beef, and less energy than beef or chicken; therefore, it requires low-heat, slow cooking to preserve tenderness and moisture.

Production 
Goats consume less forage than beef cattle. A hectare of pasture can sustain 25 goats or more, compared to five steers. A goat may produce  of meat, which is much less than that of cattle or pigs, often making goats unsuitable for modern meat processors.

Nutrition information

See also 

 Goat farming
 List of domesticated meat animals
 List of goat dishes
 Sheep meat

References

Further reading 

"Gourmet goat debuts in metro", by Tom Perry, Metromix Des Moines, July 9, 2008

Goat dishes
Goats
Meat by animal